Aethes matthewcruzi is a species of moth of the family Tortricidae. It is found in the United States, where it has been recorded from Maine, Michigan, Minnesota, New Hampshire and Wisconsin.

The ground color of the forewings is cream with brown suffusions. The markings are reduced to small, black, buff and brown spots. The hindwings are drab grey. Adults are on wing from June to August, probably in one generation per year.

Etymology
The species is named in honor of Matthew Edward Cruz.

References

matthewcruzi
Moths described in 2002
Moths of North America